The International Archives of Occupational and Environmental Health is a peer-reviewed medical journal covering occupational and environmental health. It was established in 1930 under the name Archiv für Gewerbepathologie und Gewerbehygiene; its name was changed to Internationales Archiv für Gewerbepathologie und Gewerbehygiene beginning in 1962. In 1970, the journal's name was again changed, this time to Internationales Archiv für Arbeitsmedizin. The journal obtained its current name in 1975. It is published ten times per year by Springer Science+Business Media and the editor-in-chief is Edwin van Wijngaarden (University of Rochester). The journal has a 2021 impact factor of 2.851.

References

External links

Environmental health journals
Springer Science+Business Media academic journals
Publications established in 1930
English-language journals
Occupational safety and health journals
10 times per year journals